Julien Poulin (born April 20, 1946) is Canadian actor, film director, screenwriter and film producer. He has portrayed numerous roles in several popular Quebec films and series.

Elvis Gratton films
His most memorable role was Elvis Gratton in which his character impersonates rock and roll icon Elvis Presley. The series of Elvis Gratton films appeared between 1981 and 2004. The most recent of these films were Elvis Gratton II: Miracle à Memphis, filmed in 1999, in which Elvis was resuscitated from the first film of the series, and Elvis Gratton 3: Le retour d'Elvis Wong, which was filmed in 2004.

He also co-directed some of the films along with Pierre Falardeau.

Other roles
In addition to the Elvis Gratton films, Poulin also played several main and supporting roles in other films and television series including The Crime of Ovide Plouffe (Le Crime d'Ovide Plouffe) in 1984, Lance et Compte in 1986, The Party (Le Party) in 1990, Virginie in 1996, Jasmine and Omerta 2, la loi du silence in 1997, Les orphelins de Duplessis and Le Dernier souffle in 1999, February 15, 1839 (15 février 1839) and Fortier in 2001, Séraphin: Heart of Stone (Séraphin: un homme et son péché)in 2002 and Le Negociateur 1 and Le Negociateur 2 in 2005-2006.

Julien Poulin portrays Gaétan Langlois in the award-winning show Minuit, le soir.

In 2007-2009, Poulin took the title role of Bob Gratton in the new TQS series Bob Gratton: Ma Vie, My Life.

Julien Poulin also played in Fred Pellerin's Babine.

Julien Poulin's latest role he played in episode 20 as Jessica's father in Radio-Canada's Unité 9 (2016)

Off-screen
Poulin was the spokesperson for Opération Nez rouge in 1996, a campaign against drinking and driving during the holidays.

Selected filmography

Tu brûles... tu brûles... (1973)
Réjeanne Padovani (1973) - Mike Delvecchio
 (1975) - Angelo
Bernie and the Gang (Ti-mine, Bernie pis la gang...) (1977)
M'en revenant par les épinettes (1977) - Pierre
Elvis Gratton (1981) - Bob 'Elvis' Gratton
The Years of Dreams and Revolt (Les années de rêves) (1984) - Photographe du mariage
The Alley Cat (1985) - Rosaro Gladu
Elvis Gratton: Le king des kings (1985) - Bob Gratton
Pas encore Elvis Gratton! (1985) - Bob Gratton
Henri (1987) - Begin
Gaspard et fil$ (1988) - Charles
Unfaithful Mornings (Les matins infidèles) (1989) - Le patron du snack-bar
In the Belly of the Dragon (1989) - Gardien guerite
How to Make Love to a Negro Without Getting Tired (1989) - Pusher #1
The Gunrunner (1989) - First intruder
The Party (Le Party) (1990) - Boyer
Solo (1991) - Fernand
Ma soeur, mon amour (1992) - L'épicier
Doublures (1993)
L'oreille d'un sourd (1993) - Vic Joyal
The Last Breath (Le dernier souffle) (1999) - Norman Vaillancourt
Elvis Gratton II: Miracle à Memphis (1999) - Bob 'Elvis' Gratton / Himself
Pin-Pon: Le film (1999) - Oncle Mimile
Heaven (Le petit ciel) (2000) - Jesus Christ
Nuremberg (2000, TV Mini-Series) - Dr. Robert Ley
February 15, 1839 (2001) - Curé Marier
Karmina 2 (2001) - Vincent Proulx
Séraphin: Heart of Stone (Séraphin: un homme et son péché) (2001) - Père Ovide
Taking Lives (2004) - Québec City Inspector
Machine Gun Molly (2004) - Loignon enquêteur
Elvis Gratton 3: Le retour d'Elvis Wong (2004) - Bob 'Elvis' Gratton
Bob Gratton: Ma Vie, My Life (2007-2009) - Bob Gratton
Babine (2008) - Le Vieux Curé
The Girl in the White Coat (2011) - Elise's Father
Camion (2012) - Germain
Small Blind (La mise à l'aveugle) (2012) - Michel
Redemption (2013) - Gilles Mercier
Miraculum (2014) - Raymond
The Bunker (2014) - Guerard
Paul à Québec (2015) - Père de Paul
Kiss Me Like a Lover (Embrasse-moi comme tu m'aimes) (2016) - Sergent Boileau
Les Pays d'en haut (2016-2019) — Père Laloge
Mad Dog Labine (2018) - (voice)
Family Game (Arsenault et fils) (2022) - Armand Arsenault

References

External links
 Poulin's filmography from the New York Times
 

1946 births
Living people
People from Mercier–Hochelaga-Maisonneuve
Quebec sovereigntists
Male actors from Montreal
Film directors from Montreal
Canadian male film actors
Canadian male television actors
Film producers from Quebec
Canadian male screenwriters
Best Actor Jutra and Iris Award winners
20th-century Canadian male actors
21st-century Canadian male actors
Best Supporting Actor Jutra and Iris Award winners